Cryptophyllium is a new (2021) genus of leaf insects in the tribe Phylliini. The current distribution is probably incomplete, but includes southern China, Sri Lanka, Indo-China, Malesia and western Pacific islands.

Description
Several species were previously placed in the genus Phyllium (subgenus Phyllium) which is very similar. Females of Cryptophyllium have antennae typically with the fourth segment short and disk-like at least 3× wider than long, and shorter than any of the following three segments. With Phyllium, the fourth antennal segment is as tall as wide, of a similar height to each of the following three segments length and not notably shorter. Females range from 77 to 107 mm long and males from about 55–90 mm.

Species

The Phasmida Species File currently (July 2021) lists:
 Cryptophyllium animatum Cumming, Bank, Bresseel, Constant, Le Tirant, Dong, Soner & Bradler, 2021
 Cryptophyllium athanysus (Westwood, 1859)
Cryptophyllium bankoi Cumming, Bank, Bresseel, Constant, Le Tirant, Dong, Sonet & Bradler, 2021
Cryptophyllium bollensi Cumming, Bank, Bresseel, Constant, Le Tirant, Dong, Sonet & Bradler, 2021
 Cryptophyllium celebicum (De Haan, 1842) - type species (as Phyllium celebicum Haan W de)
 Cryptophyllium chrisangi (Seow-Choen, 2017)
 Cryptophyllium daparo Cumming, Bank, Bresseel, Constant, Le Tirant, Dong, Sonet & Bradler, 2021
Cryptophyllium drunganum (Yang, 1995)
Cryptophyllium echidna Cumming, Bank, Bresseel, Constant, Le Tirant, Dong, Sonet & Bradler, 2021
Cryptophyllium faulkneri Cumming, Bank, Bresseel, Constant, Le Tirant, Dong, Sonet & Bradler, 2021
Cryptophyllium icarus Cumming, Bank, Bresseel, Constant, Le Tirant, Dong, Sonet & Bradler, 2021
Cryptophyllium khmer Cumming, Bank, Bresseel, Constant, Le Tirant, Dong, Sonet & Bradler, 2021
Cryptophyllium limogesi Cumming, Bank, Bresseel, Constant, Le Tirant, Dong, Sonet & Bradler, 2021
Cryptophyllium liyananae Cumming, Bank, Bresseel, Constant, Le Tirant, Dong, Sonet & Bradler, 2021
Cryptophyllium nuichuaense Cumming, Bank, Bresseel, Constant, Le Tirant, Dong, Sonet & Bradler, 2021
 Cryptophyllium oyae (Cumming & Le Tirant, 2020)
 Cryptophyllium parum (Liu, 1993)
Cryptophyllium phami Cumming, Bank, Bresseel, Constant, Le Tirant, Dong, Sonet & Bradler, 2021
 Cryptophyllium rarum (Liu, 1993)
 Cryptophyllium tibetense (Liu, 1993)
Cryptophyllium wennae Cumming, Bank, Bresseel, Constant, Le Tirant, Dong, Sonet & Bradler, 2021
 Cryptophyllium westwoodii (Wood-Mason, 1875)
 Cryptophyllium yapicum (Cumming & Teemsma, 2018)
 Cryptophyllium yunnanense (Liu, 1993)

References

External links 

Phasmatodea genera
Phasmatodea of Asia
Phylliidae